Toronto Comicon (currently stylized as Toronto Comicon, previously as Toronto ComiCon) is an annual comic book and pop culture convention held in Toronto, Ontario, Canada at the Metro Toronto Convention Centre since 2001. It is owned and operated by Informa's Fan Expo HQ.

History 
From 2001 to 2012, Hobby Star Marketing, Inc. (who also ran Fan Expo Canada) held fall, spring, and winter one-day comic book conventions called the Toronto ComiCON at the Metro Toronto Convention Centre. From 2004 to 2011, the spring event was referred to as the "Fan Appreciation Event" and included free admission held in conjunction with participating Toronto-area comic book stores such as the Silver Snail. Since 2007 the annual spring Toronto Comicon has been a multi-day event, in 2012 it expanded to incorporate the annual March Toronto AnimeCon (MTAC).

Beginning in 2012, the Toronto Comicon format underwent extensive restructuring has now become a three-day event that "[boasts] unique exhibitors, presentations, workshops and many celebrity guests."

Since the changes, the convention has attracted more high-profile guests and attendance rates have increased, therefore making it a key competitor to Toronto Comic Con.

The 2020 and 2021 editions of the event were cancelled due to the COVID-19 pandemic.

Dates

References

External links
 Official website

Comics conventions in Canada
Semiannual events
Spring (season) events in Canada